Alexandra Jane Sharp (born 4 February 1997) is an Australian professional basketball player.

Early life and career
Sharp was born in Melbourne, Victoria, and attended Our Lady of Mercy College.

Sharp attended the Australian Institute of Sport (AIS) and played in the SEABL for the program's BA Centre of Excellence team in 2014 and 2015. In 2016, she played in the Big V for the Diamond Valley Eagles.

College career
Sharp played college basketball at Wake Forest University in Winston-Salem, North Carolina, playing with the Demon Deacons in the Atlantic Coast Conference of the NCAA Division I.

Statistics 

|-
|2016–17
| align="left" |Wake Forest
|32
|25
|33.4
|.337
|.345
|.712
|7.6
|2.3
|0.6
|0.6
|3.0
|7.4
|-
|2017–18
| align="left" |Wake Forest
|15
|15
|35.3
|.381
|.319
|.762
|9.3
|2.3
|0.8
|0.4
|2.6
|12.7
|-
|2018–19
| align="left"|Wake Forest
|31
|31
|33.2
|.421
|.250
|.681
|8.4
|3.0
|0.5
|0.5
|2.8
|10.5
|-
|2019–20
| align="left"|Wake Forest
|32
|32
|33.3
|.420
|.402
|.800
|8.7
|1.8
|0.8
|0.4
|2.4
|12.3
|-
|Career
|
|110
|103
|33.8
|.451
|.334
|.740
|8.3
|2.4
|0.6
|0.5
|2.7
|10.4

Professional career

Perth Lynx and Willetton Tigers (2020–present)
In July 2020, Sharp signed her first professional contract with the Perth Lynx of the WNBL. During the 2020 WNBL Hub season in Queensland, she led the team in rebounds with 7.9 per game and was the fourth highest scorer with 8.9 points per game.

In 2021, Sharp joined the Willetton Tigers for the NBL1 West season. She was named NBL1 West MVP and All-NBL1 West First Team and helped lead the Tigers to the grand final, where they defeated the Joondalup Wolves 65–54 to win the championship. Sharp was named grand final MVP for her 13 points, 15 rebounds and four assists. In 20 games, she averaged 18.95 points, 13.3 rebounds, 5.25 assists and 1.7 steals per game.

Sharp recommitted to the Lynx for the 2021–22 WNBL season. She re-joined the Willetton Tigers for the 2022 NBL1 West season.

On 10 June 2022, Sharp re-signed with the Lynx for the 2022–23 WNBL season. She is set to re-join the Willetton Tigers for the 2023 NBL1 West season.

National team career
Sharp made her international debut with the Sapphires at the 2013 FIBA Under-16 Oceania Championship in Melbourne where Australia swept New Zealand to take home Gold. Sharp would go on to represent the Sapphires at the FIBA Under-17 World Championship in the Czech Republic the following year.

Sharp then made her debut with the Gems at the 2015 FIBA Under-19 World Championship in Russia, where the Gems took home the bronze.

Sharp was named to represent the Australian Opals at the 2021 FIBA Asia Cup.

References

External links

NBL1 profile
2021 FIBA Asia Cup profile

1997 births
Living people
Australian expatriate basketball people in the United States
Australian women's basketball players
Guards (basketball)
Perth Lynx players
Wake Forest Demon Deacons women's basketball players
Universiade medalists in basketball
Universiade gold medalists for Australia
Medalists at the 2017 Summer Universiade
Medalists at the 2019 Summer Universiade